Passandra is a genus of beetles in the family Passandridae.

Species
 Passandra apicalis Grouvelle
 Passandra blanchardi Grouvelle
 Passandra doriai Grouvelle
 Passandra elongatula Grouvelle
 Passandra fasciata Gray
 Passandra gemellipara Newman
 Passandra gigas Fabricius
 Passandra goudoti Grouvelle
 Passandra harmandi Grouvelle
 Passandra heros Fabricius
 Passandra kasiae Slipinski
 Passandra lineicollis Reitter
 Passandra marginata Grouvelle
 Passandra murrayi Grouvelle
 Passandra nodicornis Snellen
 Passandra oblongicollis Fairmaire
 Passandra penicillata Waterhouse
 Passandra popeorum Slipinski
 Passandra punctulicollis Fairmaire
 Passandra quadrilineata Smith
 Passandra rufipennis Fabricius
 Passandra sagena Lefkovitch
 Passandra semifusca Newman
 Passandra sexstriata Dalman
 Passandra simplex Murray
 Passandra tenuicornis Grouvelle
 Passandra trigemina Newman
 Passandra uniformis Waterhouse
 Passandra waterhousei Grouvelle
 Passandra zairensis Slipinski

References

Passandridae